Sverdlovsky City District is one of the seven city districts of the city of Perm in Perm Krai, Russia, located in the Kama River's left bank. Population:  It is the most populous district of Perm.

Etymology
It is named for Yakov Sverdlov, who led the party organizations in the Urals during the revolution of 1905-1907.

History
The district was established on May 27, 1936 as Stalinsky.

References

External links
Official website of the Administration of Sverdlovsky City District 

City districts of Perm, Russia